The Transport Licensing Act 1931 was a New Zealand Act of Parliament regulating land transport. It was introduced following a Royal Commission on road and rail competition in 1930. The Act also regulated aspects such as safety and insurance requirements for carriers and the regulation of public passenger services.

Amendments
In 1939, town carriers were regulated.

Maximum distance protection
In 1936, the protection of railways was extended to cover all freight conveyed over distances greater than those specified by the Act. This was by far the most crucial regulation, as it gave rail an effective monopoly on long-distance freight transport.

Livestock
In 1961, livestock was exempted from the Transport Licensing Act.

Repeal
The Act was repealed in 1982, effectively deregulating land transport and opening the railways up to competition. The Railways Department was corporatised as the New Zealand Railways Corporation as a result, and throughout the 1980s until the early 1990s lost substantial amounts of freight to road carriers. Freight traffic reached its low point in 1993, and since then railway freight traffic has increased.

References

Citations

Bibliography

External links
 New Zealand Acts As Enacted - Transport Licensing Act 1931

See also
 Transport in New Zealand

Transport law in New Zealand
Rail transport in New Zealand
Statutes of New Zealand
1931 in New Zealand law
Repealed New Zealand legislation
History of transport in New Zealand
1931 in rail transport
Transport legislation